In British slang, a "jam sandwich" or "jam butty" is a police car with a red stripe applied to the side.

History

The term came into common use in the 1970s, when such cars changed from the traditional blue and white colour scheme to white/grey with a broad fluorescent orange stripe along the side. This colour scheme is reminiscent of jam sandwiched between two slices of white bread, hence the name. The slang was popularised on TV shows such as The Bill, The Sweeney and Minder; as well as spreading through the use of CB radio. It is still in common use, although increasingly police cars use Battenburg markings.

In November 2012, London's Metropolitan Police Service began to replace the liveries of its marked vehicles from the 'jam sandwich' style to Battenburg markings, in line with other police forces' marked police vehicles. In the Metropolitan Police Service, the term 'jam sandwich' now refers not to a car with a specific role, but to the car's livery only. Most jam sandwich-liveried vehicles are the remaining older models of police vehicles that have not yet been replaced, and public order carriers.

A Rover SD1 Vitesse previously used by Grampian Police and restored as an episode of UK television series For The Love of Cars was sold in 2015 at the National Exhibition Centre to the Grampian Transport Museum for what was reported as a world record auction price for the Rover model.

See also
Panda car

References

External links

Restored examples of many types of UK police vehicles

Law enforcement in the United Kingdom
Police vehicles
Slang
Automotive terminology